The Emirate of Nekor or Salihid Emirate was an emirate centered in the Rif area of present-day Morocco. Its capital was initially located at Temsaman, and then moved to Nekor. The dynasty was of Himyarite Arab descent from a certain companion of Uqba ibn Nafi (d. 683). The emirate was founded in 710 CE by Salih I ibn Mansur through a Caliphate grant. Under his guidance, the local Berber tribes adopted Islam, but later deposed him in favor of one az-Zaydi from the Nafza tribe. They subsequently changed their mind and reappointed Ibn Mansur. His dynasty, the Banū Sālih, thereafter ruled the region until 1019.

In 859, the kingdom became subject to a 62 ship-strong group of Vikings who defeated a Moorish force in Nekor that had attempted to interfere with their plundering in the area. After staying for eight days in Morocco, the Vikings returned to Spain and continued up the east coast.

The Nekor kingdom comprised part of the Moroccan Rif and included the tribes of Zouagha and Djeraoua of Ibn Abī l-ʻAys, about five days' journey from Nekor. This area was flanked by the territory of the Matmata, Kebdana, Mernissa, Ghassasa of Mount Herek, and Quluʻ Jarra belonging to the Banū Urtendi. On the west, it extended to the Banū Marwan of Ghomara and the Banū Humayd and bordered the Mestassa and Sanhaja. Behind these lay the Awraba, the band of Ferhun, the Banū Walīd, the Zenata, the Banū Irnian and the Banū Merasen of the band of Qāsim, Lord of Sa. In the north, it was bounded by the sea, some five miles from Nekor.

Salihid rulers
Salih I ibn Mansur "al-`Abd as-Salih" (710–749)
al-Mu'tasim ibn Salih (749–?), said to have been very pious
Idris I ibn Salih (?–760), who founded Nekor
Sa'id I ibn Idris (760–803), who moved the capital to Nekor. In his reign, Nekor was sacked by the Vikings, who took many prisoners, a few of whom were ransomed by the Umayyad ruler of Spain. Later, part of the Ghomara tribe revolted, led by a person called Segguen; their revolt was defeated.
Salih II ibn Sa'id (803–864), whose brother led a revolt against him, but was defeated.
Sa'id II ibn Salih (864–916); his older brother and uncle led an unsuccessful revolt against him, but he was ultimately defeated and killed by the Fatimid general Masala ibn Habus, who conquered the area for six months.  However, his sons took refuge in Málaga with the Umayyad caliph of Córdoba, and returned once Masala had left the region and successfully expelled his garrison.
Salih III ibn Sa'id (917–927); in gratitude, he acknowledged the Umayyads as the rightful caliphs, thus transferring his nominal allegiance.
Abd al-Badi' ibn Salih "el-Mu'ayyid" (927–929); he was defeated and killed by another Fatimid general, Musa ibn Abi'l-Afiya, who destroyed Nekor again.  However, the line was resumed (and the city rebuilt) by:
Abu Ayyub Isma'il ibn 'Abd al Malik ibn Abd ar-Rahman ibn Sa'id I ibn Salih (930?–935), who was defeated and killed by yet another Fatimid general, Sandal the mawla.  However, when Sandal departed for Fez, installing a governor called Marmazu of the Kutama tribe, the inhabitants rebelled and installed yet another member of the line:
Musa ibn Rumi ibn Abd as-Sami` ibn Salih ibn Idris I ibn Salih (936?–940), who defeated Marmazu and sent his head to the Umayyad caliph in Cordoba.  However, he was soon exiled by his relative:
Abd as-Sami' ibn Jurthum ibn Idris ibn Salih I ibn Mansur (940–947).  His people rose up and killed him, and then sent for one of his relatives from Málaga:
Jurthum ibn Ahmad ibn Ziyadat Allah ibn Sa'id I ibn Idris (947–970), who adopted the Maliki school of jurisprudence.

Thenceforth, the emirate remained in his line until the Azdaji emir Ya'la ibn Futuh conquered it in 1019 and expelled the family.

All dates are converted from Hijri, and may be up to a year out.  This is largely based on Ibn Khaldun, whose account is itself based on al-Bakri.

See also
 Berghouata
 Maghrawa
 List of Sunni Muslim dynasties

References

1010s disestablishments
11th-century disestablishments in Africa
States and territories established in the 710s
Rif
Nekor, Kingdom of
710 establishments
Muslim dynasties
Medieval Morocco
Arab_dynasties
8th-century establishments in Africa
Melilla